Vladimir Nikolayevich Lobkaryov (born 17 September 1993) is a Russian football player. He plays for Kuban Krasnodar.

Club career
He made his debut in the Russian Second Division for FC Torpedo Armavir on 26 July 2012 in a game against FC Angusht Nazran.

He made his debut for FC Kuban Krasnodar on 12 December 2013 in a Europa League game against Valencia. He made his Russian Premier League debut for Kuban on 10 March 2014 against FC Rostov.

References

External links
 
 

1993 births
People from Novorossiysk
Sportspeople from Krasnodar Krai
Living people
Russian footballers
Association football defenders
FC Kuban Krasnodar players
FC Armavir players
FC Rotor Volgograd players
FC Volgar Astrakhan players
FC Urozhay Krasnodar players
Russian Premier League players
Russian First League players
Russian Second League players